Tracy Wiscombe (born 21 January 1979) is a retired Scottish Paralympic swimmer who competed for Great Britain at international level events. She was Scotland's most successful sportsperson with a learning disability.

References

1979 births
Living people
Sportspeople from Fife
Paralympic swimmers of Great Britain
Scottish female swimmers
Swimmers at the 1996 Summer Paralympics
Swimmers at the 2000 Summer Paralympics
Medalists at the 1996 Summer Paralympics
Medalists at the 2000 Summer Paralympics
Paralympic medalists in swimming
Paralympic gold medalists for Great Britain
Paralympic silver medalists for Great Britain
Paralympic bronze medalists for Great Britain
S14-classified Paralympic swimmers
British female freestyle swimmers
British female butterfly swimmers